Centroceras is a genus of red algae belonging to the family Ceramiaceae.

Species
 

Species:

Centroceras apiculatum 
Centroceras arcii 
Centroceras bellum

References

Ceramiales
Red algae genera